Alfredo Hunger (born 3 January 1955) is a Peruvian former breaststroke swimmer. He competed in two events at the 1972 Summer Olympics.

References

External links
 

1955 births
Living people
Peruvian male breaststroke swimmers
Olympic swimmers of Peru
Swimmers at the 1972 Summer Olympics
Place of birth missing (living people)
20th-century Peruvian people